The 142nd Massachusetts General Court, consisting of the Massachusetts Senate and the Massachusetts House of Representatives, met in 1921 and 1922.

Senators

Representatives

See also
 1922 Massachusetts gubernatorial election
 67th United States Congress
 List of Massachusetts General Courts

References

Further reading

External links

 
 
 
 

Political history of Massachusetts
Massachusetts legislative sessions
massachusetts
1921 in Massachusetts
massachusetts
1922 in Massachusetts